Huehuetla Tepehua is a moribund Tepehua language spoken in Huehuetla, northeastern Hidalgo, Mexico. There are fewer than 1,500 speakers left according to Susan Smythe Kung (2007).

Syntax
Word order tends to be VSO, although it can be SVO at times (Kung 2007).

Phonology

Consonants

The voiced stops /b/, /d/, and /g/, as well as the flap /ɾ/ and the trill /r/, appear only in loanwords and ideophones.  In younger speakers, the uvular /q/ has merged with the glottal stop /ʔ/.

Vowels

Morphology
Huehuetla Tepehua has a large variety of affixes (Kung 2007).

Valency-changing affixes
Reflexive -kan
Reciprocal laa-
Dative -ni
Causative maa-
Instrumental puu- 
Comitative t'aa-
Applicative 

Aspectual derivational affixes
Inchoative ta-
Imminent ti-
Roundtrip kii- 
Ambulative  
Begin 
Desiderative  
Repetitive  
Again 
All 
Distal -chaa and Proximal 

Derivative affixes
Agent nominalizer –nV7
Non-agentive nominalizers –ti and -nti
Deverbalizer -n
Instrumental prefixes paa- and lhaa-
Locative prefix puu-
Applicative prefix 
Comitative prefix t'aa-

Further reading

References

Sources

Indigenous languages of Mexico
Mesoamerican languages
Totonacan languages